The Rockefeller family is an American industrial, political, and banking family that owns one of the world's largest fortunes. The fortune was made in the American petroleum industry during the late 19th and early 20th centuries by brothers John D. Rockefeller and William A. Rockefeller Jr., primarily through Standard Oil (the predecessor of ExxonMobil and Chevron Corporation). The family had a long association with, and control of, Chase Manhattan Bank. By 1977, the Rockefellers were considered one of the most powerful families in American history. The Rockefeller family originated in Rhineland in Germany and family members moved to the Americas in the early 18th century, while through Eliza Davison, with family roots in Middlesex County, New Jersey, John D. Rockefeller and William A. Rockefeller Jr. and their descendants are also of Scotch-Irish ancestry.

Background
The Rockefeller family originated in the Rhineland region in Germany and can be traced to the town Neuwied in the early 17th century. The American family branch is descended from Johann Peter Rockefeller, who migrated from the Rhineland to Philadelphia in the Province of Pennsylvania  around 1723. In the US, he became a plantation owner and landholder in Somerville, and Amwell, New Jersey.

One of the first members of the Rockefeller family in New York was businessman William A. Rockefeller Sr., who was born to a Protestant family in Granger, New York. He had six children with his first wife Eliza Davison, a daughter of a Scots-Irish farmer, the most prominent of which were oil tycoons John D. Rockefeller and William A. Rockefeller Jr., the co-founders of Standard Oil. John D. Rockefeller (known as "Senior", as opposed to his son John D. Rockefeller Jr., known as "Junior") was a devout Northern Baptist, and he supported many church-based institutions.  While the Rockefeller family are mostly Baptists, some of the Rockefellers were Episcopalians.

Wealth

The combined wealth of the family—their total assets and investments plus the individual wealth of its members—has never been known with any precision. The records of the family archives relating to both the family and individual members' net worth are closed to researchers.

From the outset, the family's wealth has been under the complete control of the male members of the dynasty, through the family office. Despite strong-willed wives who had influence over their husbands' decisions—such as the pivotal female figure Abby Aldrich Rockefeller, wife of John D. Rockefeller Jr.—in all cases they received allowances only and were never given even partial responsibility for the family fortune.

Much of the wealth has been locked up in the family trust of 1934 (which holds the bulk of the fortune and matures on the death of the fourth generation) and the trust of 1952, both administered by Chase Bank, the corporate successor to Chase Manhattan Bank. These trusts have consisted of shares in the successor companies to Standard Oil and other diversified investments, as well as the family's considerable real estate holdings. They are administered by a trust committee that oversees the fortune.

Management of this fortune today also rests with professional money managers who oversee the principal holding company, Rockefeller Financial Services, which controls all the family's investments, now that Rockefeller Center is no longer owned by the family. The present chairman is David Rockefeller Jr.

In 1992, it had five main arms:
Rockefeller & Co. (Money management: Universities have invested some of their endowments in this company);
 Venrock Associates (Venture Capital: an early investment in Apple Computer was one of many it made in Silicon Valley entrepreneurial start-ups);
Rockefeller Trust Company (Manages hundreds of family trusts);
Rockefeller Insurance Company (Manages liability insurance for family members);
Acadia Risk Management (Insurance Broker: Contracts out policies for the family's vast art collections, real estate and private planes.)

Real estate and institutions 

The family was heavily involved in numerous real estate construction projects in the U.S. during the 20th century.  Chief among them:
 Rockefeller Center, a multi-building complex built at the start of the Depression in Midtown Manhattan. The construction of Rockefeller Center was financed solely by the family
 International House of New York, New York City, 1924 (John Jr.) {Involvement: John III, Abby Aldrich, David & Peggy, David Jr., Abby O'Neill}
 Wren Building, College of William and Mary, Virginia, from 1927 (Renovation funded by Junior)
 Colonial Williamsburg, Virginia, from 1927 onwards (Junior), Abby Aldrich, John III and Winthrop, historical restoration
 Museum of Modern Art, New York City, from 1929 (Abby Aldrich, John Jr., Blanchette, Nelson, David, David Jr., Sharon Percy Rockefeller)
 Riverside Church, New York City, 1930 (John Jr.)
 The Cloisters, New York City, from 1934 (John Jr.)
 Rockefeller Apartments, New York City, 1936 (John Jr., Nelson)
 The Interchurch Center, New York City, 1948 (John Jr.)
 Asia Society (Asia House), New York City, 1956 (John III)
 One Chase Manhattan Plaza, New York City, 1961 (David)
 Nelson A. Rockefeller Empire State Plaza, Albany, New York, 1962 (Nelson)
 Lincoln Center, New York City, 1962 (John III)
 World Trade Center Twin Towers, New York City, 1973–2001 (David and Nelson)
 Embarcadero Center, San Francisco, 1974 (David)
 Council of the Americas/Americas Society, New York City, 1985 (David)
In addition to this is Senior and Junior's involvement in seven major housing developments:
 Forest Hill Estates, Cleveland, Ohio
 City Housing Corporation'''s efforts, Sunnyside Gardens, Queens, New York City
 Thomas Garden Apartments, The Bronx, New York City
 Paul Laurence Dunbar Housing, Harlem, New York City
 Lavoisier Apartments, Manhattan, New York City
 Van Tassel Apartments, Sleepy Hollow, New York (formerly North Tarrytown)
 A development in Radburn, New Jersey
 A further project involved David Rockefeller in a major middle-income housing development when he was elected in 1947 as chairman of Morningside Heights, Inc., in Manhattan by fourteen major institutions that were based in the area, including Columbia University. The result, in 1951, was the six-building apartment complex known as Morningside Gardens.
 Senior's donations led to the formation of the University of Chicago in 1889; the Central Philippine University in the Philippines (The first Baptist university and second American university in Asia); and the Chicago School of Economics. This was one instance of a long family and Rockefeller Foundation tradition of financially supporting Ivy League and other major colleges and universities over the generations—seventy-five in total. These include:
 Harvard University
 Dartmouth College
 Princeton University
 University of California, Berkeley
 Stanford University
 Yale University
 Massachusetts Institute of Technology
 Brown University
 Tufts University
 Columbia University
 Cornell University
 University of Pennsylvania
 Case Western Reserve University
 Institutions overseas such as London School of Economics and University College London, among many others.
 Senior (and Junior) also created
 Rockefeller University in 1901
 General Education Board in 1902, which later (1923) evolved into the International Education Board Rockefeller Sanitary Commission in 1910
 Bureau of Social Hygiene in 1913 (Junior)
 International Health Division in 1913
 China Medical Board in 1915.
Rockefeller Museum, British Mandate of Palestine, 1925–30
 In the 1920s, the International Education Board granted important fellowships to pathbreakers in modern mathematics, such as Stefan Banach, Bartel Leendert van der Waerden, and André Weil, which was a formative part of the gradual shift of world mathematics to the US over this period.
 To help promote cooperation between physics and mathematics Rockefeller funds also supported the erection of the new Mathematical Institute at the University of Göttingen between 1926 and 1929
 The rise of probability and mathematical statistics owes much to the creation of the Institut Henri Poincaré in Paris, partly by the Rockefellers' finances, also around this time.
 John D Jr. established International House at Berkeley.
 Junior was responsible for the creation and endowment of the Colonial Williamsburg Foundation, which operates the restored historical town at Williamsburg, Virginia, one of the most extensive historic restorations ever undertaken.

Residences
Over the generations, the family members have resided in some historic homes. A total of 81 Rockefeller residences are on the National Register of Historic Places. Not including all homes owned by the five brothers, some of the more prominent of these residences are:

One Beekman Place - The residence of Laurance in New York City.
10 West 54th Street - A nine-story single-family home, the former residence of Junior before he shifted to 740 Park Avenue, and the largest residence in New York City at the time, it was the home for the five young brothers; it was later given by Junior to the Museum of Modern Art.
13 West 54th Street - A four-story townhouse used by Junior and Abby between 1901 and 1913.
740 Park Avenue - Junior and Abby's famed 40-room triplex apartment in the luxury New York City apartment building, which was later sold for a record price.
Bassett Hall - The house at Colonial Williamsburg bought by Junior in 1927 and renovated by 1936, it was the favourite residence of both Junior and Abby and is now a house museum at the family-restored Colonial Revival town.
The Casements - A three-story house at Ormond Beach in Florida, where Senior spent his last winters, from 1919 until his death.
 The Eyrie - A sprawling 100-room summer holiday home on Mount Desert Island in Maine, demolished by family members in 1962.
Forest Hill - The family's country estate and a summer home in Cleveland, Ohio, for four decades; built and occupied by Senior, it burned down in 1917.
Golf House at Lakewood, New Jersey - The former three-story clubhouse for the elite Ocean County Hunt and Country Club, which Senior bought in 1902 to play golf on its golf course.
Kykuit, also known as the John D. Rockefeller Estate - The landmark six-story, 40-room home on the vast Westchester County family estate, home to four generations of the family.
The JY Ranch - The landmark ranch in Jackson Hole, Wyoming, the holiday resort home built by Junior and later owned by Laurance, which was used by all members of the family and had many prominent visitors, including presidents until Laurance donated it to the federal government in 2001.The Rocks - 1940 Shepard Street NW and 2121 Park Road NW, Washington, DC - The 12,000 square foot house sits on 15.9 acres bordering Rock Creek Park; and is the largest residential property in the District of Columbia. Built by Daisy Blodgett for her daughter Mona in 1927, the name refers to its location, not the current owner. The property was purchased by Jay Rockefeller in 1984 when he became US Senator for West Virginia. He and his wife, Sharon Percy Rockefeller continue to live there.
Rockwood Hall - The former home of William Rockefeller Jr. (demolished in the 1940s).
Rockefeller Guest House - The guest house of Blanchette Ferry Rockefeller.

Politics
Prominent banker and philanthropist David Rockefeller Sr. was the family patriarch until his death in 2017. In 1960, when his brother Nelson Rockefeller was governor of New York, David Sr. successfully pressed for a repeal of a New York state law that restricted Chase Manhattan Bank from operating outside the city. David Sr. was twice offered the post of Treasury secretary by President Richard M. Nixon, but declined on both occasions. In 1979, he used his high-level contacts to bring Mohammad Reza Shah of Iran, who had been overthrown in the Iranian Revolution and was in poor health, for medical treatment in the United States. In 1998, he was awarded the Presidential Medal of Freedom by President Bill Clinton for his work on International Executive Service Corps.
Political offices held

Nelson Rockefeller (1908–1979)
 1st Assistant Secretary of State for American Republic Affairs, 1944–1945
 1st Under Secretary Health, Education and Welfare, 1953–1954
Governor of New York, 1959–1973
U.S. Vice President, 1974–1977
Winthrop Rockefeller (1912–1973) 
Governor of Arkansas, 1967–1971
John Davison Rockefeller IV (b. 1937)
Member of West Virginia House of Delegates, 1966–1968
Secretary of State of West Virginia, 1969–1973
Governor of West Virginia, 1977–1985
U.S. Senator from West Virginia, 1985–2015
Winthrop Paul Rockefeller (1948–2006)
Lieutenant Governor of Arkansas, 1996–2006

Legacy
A trademark of the dynasty over its 140-plus years has been the remarkable unity it has maintained, despite major divisions that developed in the late 1970s, and unlike other wealthy families such as the Du Ponts and the Mellons. A primary reason has been the lifelong efforts of "Junior" to not only cleanse the name from the opprobrium stemming from the ruthless practices of Standard Oil but his tireless efforts to forge family unity even as he allowed his five sons to operate independently. This was partly achieved by regular brothers and family meetings, but it was also because of the high value placed on family unity by first Nelson and John III, and later especially with David.

Regarding achievements, in 1972, on the 100th anniversary of the founding of Andrew Carnegie's philanthropy, the Carnegie Corporation, which has had a long association with the family and its institutions, released a public statement on the influence of the family on not just philanthropy but encompassing a much wider field. Summing up a predominant view among the international philanthropic world, albeit one poorly grasped by the public, one sentence of this statement read: "The contributions of the Rockefeller family are staggering in their extraordinary range and in the scope of their contribution to humankind."

John D. Rockefeller gave away US$540 million over his lifetime (in dollar terms of that time), and became the greatest lay benefactor of medicine in history. His son, Junior, also gave away over $537 million over his lifetime, bringing the total philanthropy of just two generations of the family to over $1 billion from 1860 to 1960. Added to this, The New York Times declared in a report in November 2006 that David Rockefeller's total charitable benefactions amount to about $900 million over his lifetime.

The combined personal and social connections of the various family members are vast, both in the United States and throughout the world, including the most powerful politicians, royalty, public figures, and chief businessmen. Figures through Standard Oil alone have included Henry Flagler and Henry H. Rogers. Contemporary figures include Henry Kissinger, Richard Parsons (Chairman and CEO of Time Warner), C. Fred Bergsten, Peter G. Peterson (Senior Chairman of the Blackstone Group), and Paul Volcker.

In 1991, the family was presented with the Honor Award from the National Building Museum for four generations worth of preserving and creating some of the U.S.'s most important buildings and places. David accepted the award on the family's behalf. The ceremony coincided with an exhibition on the family's contributions to the built environment, including John Sr.'s preservation efforts for the Hudson River Palisades, the restoration of Williamsburg, Virginia, construction of Rockefeller Center, and Governor Nelson's efforts to construct low- and middle-income housing in New York state.

The Rockefeller name is imprinted in numerous places throughout the United States, including within New York City, but also in Cleveland, where the family originates:

  Rockefeller Center - A landmark 19-building  complex in Midtown Manhattan established by Junior: Older section constructed from 1930–1939; Newer section constructed during the 1960s-1970s;
  Rockefeller Apartments - An apartment building in Midtown Manhattan
  Rockefeller University - Renamed in 1965, this is the distinguished Nobel prize-winning graduate/postgraduate medical school (formerly the Rockefeller Institute for Medical Research, established by Senior in 1901);
  Rockefeller Foundation - Founded in 1913, this is the famous philanthropic organization set up by Senior and Junior;
  Rockefeller Brothers Fund - Founded in 1940 by the third-generation's five sons and one daughter of Junior;
  Rockefeller Family Fund - Founded in 1967 by members of the family's fourth-generation;
  Rockefeller Group - A private family-run real estate development company based in New York that originally owned, constructed and managed Rockefeller Center, it is now wholly owned by Mitsubishi Estate Co. Ltd;
  Rockefeller Philanthropy Advisors - is a 501(c)(3) nonprofit organization that advises donors in their philanthropic endeavours throughout the world;
  Rockefeller Research Laboratories Building - A major research centre into cancer that was established in 1986 and named after Laurance, this is located at the Memorial Sloan-Kettering Cancer Center;
  Rockefeller Center - Home of the International Student Services office and department of philosophy, politics and law at the State University of New York at Binghamton;
  Rockefeller Chapel - Completed in 1928, this is the tallest building on the campus of the University of Chicago, established by Senior in 1889;
  Rockefeller Hall - Established by Senior in 1906, this building houses the Case Western Reserve University Physics Department;
  Rockefeller Hall - Established by Senior and completed in 1906, this building houses the Cornell University Physics Department;
  Rockefeller Hall - Established by Senior in 1887, who granted Vassar College a $100,000 ($2.34 million in 2006 dollars) allowance to build additional, much needed lecture space. The final cost of the facility was $99,998.75. It now houses multi-purpose classrooms and departmental offices for political science, philosophy and math;
  Rockefeller Hall - Established by Senior and completed in 1886, this is the oldest building on the campus of Spelman College;
  Rockefeller College - Named after John D. Rockefeller III, this is a residential college at Princeton University;
  Michael C. Rockefeller Arts Center - Completed in 1969 in memory of Nelson Rockefeller's son, this is a cultural centre at the State University of New York at Fredonia;
 The Michael C. Rockefeller Collection and the Department of Primitive Art - Completed in 1982 after being initiated by Nelson, this is a wing of the Metropolitan Museum of Art;
  David and Peggy Rockefeller Building - A tribute to David's wife, Peggy Rockefeller, this is a new (completed in 2004) six-story building housing the main collection and temporary exhibition galleries of the family's Museum of Modern Art;
  Abby Aldrich Rockefeller Sculpture Garden - Completed in 1949 by David, this is a major outdoor feature of the Museum of Modern Art;
  Abby Aldrich Rockefeller Folk Art Museum - Opened in 1957 by Junior, this is a leading folk art museum just outside the historic district of Junior's Colonial Williamsburg;
  Abby Aldrich Rockefeller Hall - The freshman residence hall on the campus of Spelman College;
  Laura Spelman Rockefeller Memorial Building - Completed in 1918, it is among other things a student residence hall at Spelman College, after the wife of Senior and after whom the College was named;
  Rockefeller State Park Preserve - Part of the  family estate in Westchester County, this  preserve was officially handed over to New York State in 1983, although it had previously always been open to the public;
  Marsh-Billings-Rockefeller National Historical Park - Established as a historical museum of conservation by Laurance during the 1990s.
  John D. Rockefeller Jr. Memorial Parkway - Established in 1972 through Congressional authorization, connecting Yellowstone and Grand Teton National Parks;
  Rockefeller Forest - Funded by Junior, this is located within Humboldt Redwoods State Park, California's largest redwood state park;
 Either of two US congressional committees {in 1972 - John D. III and 1975 - Nelson dubbed the Rockefeller Commission}.
 Rockefeller Park, a scenic park featuring gardens dedicated to several world nations along Martin Luther King Jr. Blvd. between University Circle and Lake Erie in Cleveland.
  Winthrop Rockefeller Institute of the University of Arkansas System was established in 2005 with a grant from the Winthrop Rockefeller Charitable Trust. The educational center with conference and lodging facilities is located on Petit Jean Mountain near Morrilton, Arkansas, on the original grounds of Gov. Winthrop Rockefeller's model cattle farm.
  David Rockefeller Center for Latin American Studies at Harvard University.
  Rockefeller Quad at the Loomis Chaffee School
  Rockefeller Complex library at Niels Bohr Institute, Nørrebro, Copenhagen Municipality in Denmark
John Jr., through his son Nelson, purchased and then donated the land upon which sits the United Nations headquarters, in New York, in 1946. Earlier, in the 1920s, he had also donated a substantial amount towards the restoration and rehabilitation of major buildings in France after World War I, such as the Rheims Cathedral, the Fontainebleau Palace and the Palace of Versailles, for which he was later (1936) awarded France's highest decoration, the Grand Croix of the Legion d'Honneur (subsequently also awarded decades later to his son, David Rockefeller).

He also funded the excavations at Luxor in Egypt, as well as establishing a Classical Studies School in Athens. In addition, he provided the funding for the construction of the Palestine Archaeological Museum in East Jerusalem - the Rockefeller Museum.

Conservation
Beginning with John D. Rockefeller Sr., the family has been a major force in land conservation. Over the generations, it has created more than 20 national parks and open spaces, including the Cloisters, Acadia National Park, Forest Hill Park, the Nature Conservancy, the Rockefeller Forest in California's Humboldt Redwoods State Park (the largest stand of old-growth redwoods), and Grand Teton National Park, among many others. John Jr., and his son Laurance (and his son Laurance Jr. aka Larry) were particularly prominent in this area.

The family was honoured for its conservation efforts in November 2005, by the National Audubon Society, one of the United States' largest and oldest conservation organizations, at which over 30 family members attended. At the event, the society's president, John Flicker, stated: "Cumulatively, no other family in America has made the contribution to conservation that the Rockefeller family has made".

In 2016 fifth-generation descendants of John Sr. criticized ExxonMobil, one of the successors to his company Standard Oil, for their record on climate change.  The Rockefeller Brothers Fund and the Rockefeller Family Fund both backed reports suggesting that ExxonMobil knew more about the threat of global warming than it had disclosed. David Kaiser, grandson of David Rockefeller Sr. and president of the Rockefeller Family Fund, said that the "...company seems to be morally bankrupt."  Valerie Rockefeller Wayne, daughter of former Senator Jay Rockefeller, said, "Because the source of the family wealth is fossil fuels, we feel an enormous moral responsibility for our children, for everyone -- to move forward."  The Rockefeller Brothers Fund announced it was divesting from fossil fuels in September 2014, the Rockefeller Family Fund announced plans to divest in March 2016, and the Rockefeller Foundation pledged to dump their fossil fuel holdings in December 2020.  With a $5 billion endowment, the Rockefeller Foundation was "the largest US foundation to embrace the rapidly growing divestment movement."  CNN writer Matt Egan noted, "This divestment is especially symbolic because the Rockefeller Foundation was founded by oil money."  In May 2021 Rockefeller descendants Rebecca Rockefeller Lambert and Peter Gill Case announced a ten-year funding initiative, the Equation Campaign, to fight new fossil fuel development.

The archives
The Rockefeller family archives are held at the Rockefeller Archive Center in Pocantico Hills, North Tarrytown, New York. At present, the archives of John D. Rockefeller Sr. William Rockefeller, John D. Rockefeller, Jr., Abby Aldrich Rockefeller, Abby Rockefeller Mauzé, John D. Rockefeller III, Blanchette Rockefeller, and Nelson Rockefeller are processed and open by appointment to readers in the Archive Center's reading room. Processed portions of the papers of Laurance Rockefeller are also open. In addition, the Archive Center has a microfilm copy of the Winthrop Rockefeller papers, the originals of which are held at the University of Arkansas, Little Rock. The papers of the family office, known as the Office of the Messrs. Rockefeller, are also open for research, although those portions that relate to living family members are closed.

Members

Ancestors
Godfrey Lewis Rockefeller (1783–1857) (m. 1806) Lucy Avery (1786–1867) (ten children)
William Avery Rockefeller Sr. (1810–1906) (m. 1837) Eliza Davison (1813–1889) (eight children)
Lucy Rockefeller (1838–1878) (m. 1856) Pierson D. Briggs
 Clorinda Rockefeller (c. 1838–?, died young) (daughter from Nancy Brown)
John Davison Rockefeller Sr. (1839–1937) (m. 1864) Laura Celestia "Cettie" Spelman (1839–1915)
 Cornelia Rockefeller (c. 1840–?) (daughter from Nancy Brown)
William Avery Rockefeller Jr. (1841–1922) (m. 1864) Almira Geraldine Goodsell
Mary Ann Rockefeller (1843–1925) (m. 1872) William Cullen Rudd
Franklin "Frank" Rockefeller (1845–1917) (m. 1870) Helen Elizabeth Scofield
Frances Rockefeller (1845–1847)
William W. Rockefeller (1788–1851) (m. early 19th century) Eleanor Kisselbrack (1784–1859)

Descendants of John Davison Rockefeller Sr.
The total number of blood relative descendants as of 2006 was about 150.
Elizabeth "Bessie" Rockefeller (1866–1906) (m.1889) Charles Augustus Strong (1862–1940)
Margaret Rockefeller Strong (1897–1985) (m.1st.1927) George de Cuevas (1885–1961), (m. 2nd 1977) Raimundo de Larrain
Alice Rockefeller (1869–1870)
Alta Rockefeller (1871–1962) (m.1901) Ezra Parmelee Prentice (1863–1955)
John Rockefeller Prentice (1902–1972) (m.1941) Abra Cantrill (1912–1972)
Abra Prentice Wilkin (born 1942)
Mary Adeline Prentice Gilbert (1907–1981) (m.1937) Benjamin Davis Gilbert (1907–1992)
Spelman Prentice (1911–2000) (m.3rd.1972) Mimi Walters (four children)
Peter Spelman Prentice (born 1940)
Alexandra Sartell Prentice (born 1962)
Michael Andrew Prentice (born 1964)
Edith Rockefeller (1872–1932) (m. 1895) Harold Fowler McCormick
John Rockefeller McCormick (1896–1901)
Editha McCormick (1897–1898)
Harold Fowler McCormick Jr. (1898–1973) (m.1931) Anne "Fifi" Potter (1879–1969)
Muriel McCormick (1902–1959) (m.1931) Elisha Dyer Hubbard (1906)
Mathilde McCormick (1905–1947) (m.1923) Max Oser (1877–1942) (one child)
John Davison Rockefeller Jr. (1874–1960) (m. 1st 1901) Abigail Greene "Abby" Aldrich (1874–1948)
Abigail Aldrich "Babs" Rockefeller (1903–1976) (m. 1st 1925, div. 1954) David M. Milton (1900–1976) (m. 2nd 1946, d. 1949) Irving H. Pardee (1892–1949) (m. 3rd 1953, d. 1974) Jean Mauzé (1903–1974) (two children)
Abigail Rockefeller "Abby" "Mitzi" Milton O'Neill (1928-2017) m. George Dorr O'Neill Sr. (six children; eighteen grandchildren)
Marilyn Ellen Milton (1931–1980) (two children)
John Davison Rockefeller III (1906–1978) (m.1932) Blanchette Ferry Hooker (four children)
John Davison "Jay" Rockefeller IV (born 1937) (m. 1967) Sharon Percy (four children)
John Davidson Rockefeller V (born 1969) m. Emily Tagliabue
John Davidson Rockefeller VI (born 2007)
Justin Aldrich Rockefeller (born 1979) m. Indré Vengris
Valerie Rockefeller Wayne
Hope Aldrich Rockefeller (born 1938) (three children)
Alida Ferry Rockefeller Messinger (born 1949) (m. 1st 1978–1986) Mark Dayton (m. 2nd) William Messinger (three children)
Nelson Aldrich Rockefeller (1908–1979) (m. 1st 1930–1962) Mary Todhunter Clark (m. 2nd 1963) Margaretta Large "Happy" Fitler (1926–2015) (seven children)
Rodman Clark Rockefeller (1932–2000) (m. 1st 1953–1979) Barbara Ann Olsen (m. 2nd 1980) Alexandra von Metzler (four children)
Meile Rockefeller (born 1955)
Peter C. Rockefeller (m. 1987) Allison Whipple Rockefeller
Steven Clark Rockefeller (born 1936)
Mary Clark Rockefeller (born 1938) m.1st (1961-1974) William J. Strawbridge (three children)
Michael Clark Rockefeller (1938–1961)
Nelson Aldrich Rockefeller Jr. (born 1964)
Mark Fitler Rockefeller (born 1967)
Laurance Spelman Rockefeller (1910–2004) (m.1934) Mary French
Laura Spelman Rockefeller Chasin (1936–2015)
Marion French Rockefeller (born 1938)
Dr. Lucy Rockefeller Waletzky (born 1941)
Laurance Rockefeller Jr. (born 1944) (m. 1982) Wendy Gordon (two children)
Winthrop Rockefeller (1912–1973) (m. 1st 1948, div. 1954) Jievute "Bobo" Paulekiute (1916–2008) (m. 2nd 1956, div. 1971) Jeannette Edris (1918–1997)
Winthrop Paul Rockefeller (1948–2006) (m. 1st 1971, div. 1979) Deborah Cluett Sage (m. 2nd 1983) Lisenne Dudderar (seven children)
 Andrea Davidson Rockefeller (b. 1972)
 Katherine Cluett Rockefeller (b. 1974)
 Winthrop Paul Rockefeller Jr. (b. 1976)
 William Gordon Rockefeller
 Colin Kendrick Rockefeller (b. 1990)
 John Alexander Camp Rockefeller
 Louis Henry Rockefeller
David Rockefeller (1915–2017) (m. 1940) Margaret McGrath (1915–1996)
 David Rockefeller Jr. (born 1941) (m. 1st divorced) Diana Newell-Rowan (m. 2nd 2008) Susan Cohn (two children)
Ariana Rockefeller (born 1982) (m. 1st 2010, div. 2019) Matthew Bucklin
Camilla Rockefeller (born 1984)
Abigail Rockefeller (born 1943)
Neva Goodwin Rockefeller (born 1944) (m. 1st divorced) Walter J. Kaiser (m.2nd) Bruce Mazlish (1923-2016)  
David Kaiser (1969–2020)
Margaret Dulany "Peggy" Rockefeller (born 1947)
Richard Gilder Rockefeller (1949–2014);Fallows, James, "Richard Rockefeller, MD What would you do, if you could do anything? An inspiring answer to that question.", June 14, 2014. Retrieved June 14, 2014. married to Nancy King (two children, two step-children)
Clayton Rockefeller
Rebecca Rockefeller
Eileen Rockefeller (born 1952) m. Paul Growald (two children)

Descendants of William Avery Rockefeller Jr.
An article in The New York Times in 1937 stated that William Rockefeller had, at that time, 28 great-grandchildren.

Lewis Edward Rockefeller (1865–1866)
Emma Rockefeller McAlpin (1868–1934)
William Goodsell Rockefeller (1870–1922) (five children)
William Avery Rockefeller III (1896–1973) (three children)
Elsie Rockefeller m. William Proxmire
Godfrey Stillman Rockefeller (1899–1983) (seven children)
Godfrey Anderson Rockefeller (1924–2010)
James Stillman Rockefeller (1902–2004) (four children)
Georgia Rockefeller Rose
Andrew Carnegie Rose
Louisa d'Andelot du Pont Rose
John Davison Rockefeller II (1872–1877)
Percy Avery Rockefeller (1878–1934) m. Isabel Goodrich Stillman (five children)
Isabel Stillman Rockefeller (1902–1980) m. Frederic Walker Lincoln IV
Isabel Lincoln (1927-2016) m. Basil Beebe (Stephen Basil) Elmer Jr. (1924-2007)
David Basil Elmer
Lucy Lincoln Elmer
Monica Elmer
Veronica Hoyt Elmer m. Clinton Richard Kanaga
Anthony Kanaga
Joshua Kanaga
Lindsey Kanaga
Calista Lincoln (1930-2012) m. Henry Upham Harder (1925-2004)
Frederic Walker Lincoln Harder (b. 1953) m. Karin J. E. Bolang (b. 1954)
Frederic Harder
Calista Harder
Gertrude Upham Lincoln Harder (b. 1955) m. James Briggs
Alexander Briggs
George Briggs
Holly Briggs
Katherine Briggs
Calista Harder (b. 1957) m. Jan Hollyer
Elsa Hollyer
Ian Hollyer
Holly Harris Harder (b. 1961) m. Bruce Kenneth Catlin (b. 1956)
Augustus Attilio Catlin (b. 1997)
Nickolas Charles Catlin (b. 2000)
Caroline Catlin
Henry Upham Harder Jr. (b. 1965) m. Natalie Rae Borrok (b. 1965)
Haley Rae Harder (b. 1997)
Henry Rolston Harder (b. 1999)
Charles Lincoln Harder (b. 2003)
Percilla Avery Lincoln (1937-2019) m. William Blackstone Chappell Jr. (1935-2017)
Richard Blackstone Chappell (1964-2014)
Avery Lincoln Chappell (1966-2005) m. J. Kevin Smith
Ellery Smith
Emeline Smith
Stillman Smith
Florence Philena Lincoln (b. 1940) m. Thomas Lloyd Short
Avery Rockefeller (1903–1986) m. 1923 Anna Griffith Mark (three children)
Faith Rockefeller Model (1909–1960)
Robert Model (born 1942)
Geraldine Rockefeller Dodge (1882–1973) m. Marcellus Hartley Dodge Sr.
Marcellus Hartley Dodge Jr. (1908–1930)

Spouses
Laura Celestia "Cettie" Spelman (1839–1915) – John D. Rockefeller Sr.
Abby Greene Aldrich (1874–1948) – John D. Rockefeller Jr.
Martha Baird Allen (1895–1971) – John D. Rockefeller Jr.
Mary Todhunter Clark "Tod" (1907–1999) – Nelson Rockefeller
Margaretta "Happy" Fitler (1926–2015) – Nelson Rockefeller
Anne Marie Rasmussen – Steven Clark Rockefeller
Blanchette Ferry Hooker (1909–1992) – John D. Rockefeller III
Sharon Lee Percy – John D. Rockefeller IV
Mary French (1910–1997) – Laurance Rockefeller
Wendy Gordon – Laurance "Larry" Rockefeller Jr.
Jievute "Bobo" Paulekiute (1916–2008) – Winthrop Rockefeller
Jeannette Edris (1918–1997) – Winthrop Rockefeller
Deborah Cluett Sage – Winthrop Paul Rockefeller
Lisenne Dudderar – Winthrop Paul Rockefeller
Margaret "Peggy" McGrath (1915–1996) – David Rockefeller
Diana Newell Rowan – David Rockefeller Jr.
Nancy King – Richard Gilder Rockefeller.
Sarah Elizabeth "Elsie" Stillman (1872–1935) – William Goodsell Rockefeller
Isabel Goodrich Stillman (1876–1935) – Percy Avery Rockefeller

Network

Associates

Gianni Agnelli
Aldrich family
John Dustin Archbold
Jabez A. Bostwick
Zbigniew Brzezinski
Samuel P. Bush
Duncan Candler
C. Douglas Dillon
J. Richardson Dilworth
Samuel Calvin Tate Dodd
Henry Morrison Flagler
Simon Flexner
Henry Clay Folger
Raymond B. Fosdick
Frederick Taylor Gates
George Jay Gould
Jerome Davis Greene
Harkness family
Mark Hanna
William Rainey Harper
E.H. Harriman
Wallace Harrison
Oliver Burr Jennings
William Lyon Mackenzie King
Henry Kissinger
Ivy Lee
John J. McCloy
McCormick family
James Smith McDonnell
Charles Edward Merriam
William S. Paley
Richard Parsons
Oliver H. Payne
Charles H. Percy
Peter G. Peterson
Pratt family
Eddie Rickenbacker
Henry H. Rogers
Beardsley Ruml
Dean Rusk
John D. Ryan
Jacob Schiff
James Stillman
Feargus B. Squire
Henry Morgan Tilford
Cyrus Vance
Paul Volcker
John C. Whitehead

Businesses

Allegheny Transportation Company
Amoco
Anaconda Copper
Atlantic Petroleum
Baltimore & Ohio Railroad
Buckeye Steel Castings
Chase Manhattan Bank
Chesebrough Manufacturing Company
Chevron
Chicago, Milwaukee & St. Paul Railroad
Chrysler CorporationClivus Multrum, Inc.Colorado, Fuel & Iron Co.
Conoco
Consolidation Coal CompanyCranston Print Works 
Eastern Air Lines
ExxonInternational Basic Economy Corporation 
Kyso
Marathon Oil
Marquardt Corporation
McDonnell Aircraft Corporation
Mobil
National City Bank of New York
Piasecki Helicopter
Rockefeller Apartments
Rockefeller Capital Management
Rockefeller Group
RockResorts
Santa Fe ReporterSchroder, Rockefeller & Co. 
Sohio
Standard Oil
Union Sulphur Company
Venrock Associates

Charities, colleges, and nonprofit organizations

Abby Aldrich Rockefeller Folk Art Museum
Asia Society
Central Philippine University
China Medical Board
Council of the Americas
Council on Foreign Relations
David Rockefeller Center for Latin American Studies
General Education Board
Great Smoky Mountains National Park
Group of 30
Industrial Relations Counselors, Inc.
Historic Hudson Valley
Institute for Pacific Relations
International House of New York
Jackson Hole Preserve, Inc.
John D. Rockefeller Jr. Library
Johns Hopkins Bloomberg School of Public Health

Laura Spelman Rockefeller Memorial
Memorial Sloan Kettering Cancer Center
Michael Rockefeller Wing of the Met
Museum of Automobiles
Museum of Modern Art
National Institute of Social Sciences
Nelson A. Rockefeller College of Public Affairs & Policy
New York Cancer Hospital
Population Council
Rockefeller Archeological Museum
Rockefeller Archive Center
Rockefeller Brothers Fund
Rockefeller College
Rockefeller Foundation
Rockefeller Institute of Government
Rockefeller Philanthropy Advisors 
Rockefeller University
Social Science Research Council
Spelman College
Trilateral Commission
United Nations Association
University of Chicago
Winrock International
Winthrop Rockefeller Institute

Buildings, estates and historic sites

Bassett Hall
Colonial Williamsburg
The Casements
The Cloisters
Eliza Davison HouseElm Tree HouseEmbarcadero Center
The Eyrie Summer Home
First Baptist Church of Tarrytown
Forest Hill Park (Ohio)
Giralda Farms
Grand Teton National Park
Greenacre Park
Headquarters of the United Nations
The Interchurch Center
JY Ranch
Kykuit
Lincoln Center
Marsh-Billings-Rockefeller National Historical ParkMount Hope Farm 
Ocean County Park
One Chase Manhattan PlazaOverhills 
Riverside Church
Rockefeller Center
Rockefeller Golf House
Rockefeller Guest House
Rockefeller State Park PreserveThe Rocks 
Rockwood Hall
Strong House (Vassar College)
Standard Oil Building
Villa Le Balze
Virgin Islands National Park
William Murray Residences
World Trade Center (1973–2001)

References

Citations

Other sources

Rose, Kenneth W., Select Rockefeller Philanthropies, Booklet (pdf, 23 pages) of the Rockefeller Archive Center, 2004.
Origin of Rockenfeld, in German
Descendants of Goddard Rockenfeller
Listing of University of Chicago Nobel Laureates, News Office, University of Chicago website, undated.
Depalma, Anthony, They Saved Land Like Rockefellers, The New York Times Archive, November 15, 2005.
Carnegie Corporation of New York, Celebrating 100 years of Andrew Carnegie's Philanthropy - awarding the inaugural Andrew Carnegie Medal of Philanthropy to David and Laurance Rockefeller, 2001.
The Rockefeller Archive Center, John D. Rockefeller, Junior, 1874–1960, Overview of his life and philanthropy, 1997.
Strom, Stephanie, Manhattan: A Rockefeller Plans a Huge Bequest, The New York Times Archive, November 21, 2006.
O'Connell, Dennis, Top 10 Richest Men Of All Time, AskMen.com, undated.

Further reading

Abels, Jules. The Rockefeller Billions: The Story of the World's Most Stupendous Fortune. New York: The Macmillan Company, 1965.
Aldrich, Nelson W. Jr. Old Money: The Mythology of America's Upper Class. New York: Alfred A. Knopf, 1988.
Allen, Gary. The Rockefeller File. Seal Beach, California: 1976 Press, 1976.
Boorstin, Daniel J. The Americans: The Democratic Experience. New York: Vintage Books, 1974.
Brown, E. Richard. Rockefeller Medicine Men: Medicine and Capitalism in America. Berkeley: University of California Press, 1979.

Chernow, Ron. Titan: The Life of John D. Rockefeller, Sr. London: Warner Books, 1998.
Collier, Peter, and David Horowitz. The Rockefellers: An American Dynasty. New York: Holt, Rinehart & Winston, 1976.
Elmer, Isabel Lincoln. Cinderella Rockefeller: A Life of Wealth Beyond All-Knowing. New York: Freundlich Books, 1987.
Ernst, Joseph W., editor. "Dear Father"/"Dear Son:" Correspondence of John D. Rockefeller and John D. Rockefeller Jr. New York: Fordham University Press, with the Rockefeller Archive Center, 1994.
Flynn, John T. God's Gold: The Story of Rockefeller and His Times. New York: Harcourt, Brace and Company, 1932.
Fosdick, Raymond B. John D. Rockefeller Jr.: A Portrait. New York: Harper & Brothers, 1956.
Fosdick, Raymond B. The Story of the Rockefeller Foundation. New York: Transaction Publishers, Reprint, 1989.
Gates, Frederick Taylor. Chapters in My Life. New York: The Free Press, 1977.
Gitelman, Howard M. Legacy of the Ludlow Massacre: A Chapter in American Industrial Relations. Philadelphia: University of Pennsylvania Press, 1988.
Gonzales, Donald J., Chronicled by. The Rockefellers at Williamsburg: Backstage with the Founders, Restorers and World-Renowned Guests. McLean, Virginia: EPM Publications, Inc., 1991.
Hanson, Elizabeth. The Rockefeller University Achievements: A Century of Science for the Benefit of Humankind, 1901-2001. New York: The Rockefeller University Press, 2000.
Harr, John Ensor, and Peter J. Johnson. The Rockefeller Century: Three Generations of America's Greatest Family. New York: Charles Scribner's Sons, 1988.
Harr, John Ensor, and Peter J. Johnson. The Rockefeller Conscience: An American Family in Public and in Private. New York: Charles Scribner's Sons, 1991.
Hawke, David Freeman. John D.: The Founding Father of the Rockefellers. New York: Harper & Row, 1980.
Hidy, Ralph W. and Muriel E. Hidy. Pioneering in Big Business: History of Standard Oil Company (New Jersey), 1882-1911. New York: Harper & Brothers, 1955.
Jonas, Gerald. The Circuit Riders: Rockefeller Money and the Rise of Modern Science. New York: W.W.Norton and Co., 1989.
Josephson, Emanuel M. The Federal Reserve Conspiracy and the Rockefellers: Their Gold Corner. New York: Chedney Press, 1968.
Josephson, Matthew. The Robber Barons. London: Harcourt, 1962.
Kert, Bernice. Abby Aldrich Rockefeller: The Woman in the Family. New York: Random House, 2003.
Klein, Henry H. Dynastic America and Those Who Own It. New York: Kessinger Publishing, [1921] Reprint, 2003.
Kutz, Myer. Rockefeller Power: America's Chosen Family. New York: Simon & Schuster, 1974.
Lundberg, Ferdinand. America's Sixty Families. New York: Vanguard Press, 1937.
Lundberg, Ferdinand. The Rich and the Super-Rich: A Study in the Power of Money Today. New York: Lyle Stuart, 1968.
Lundberg, Ferdinand. The Rockefeller Syndrome. Secaucus, New Jersey: Lyle Stuart, Inc., 1975.
Manchester, William R. A Rockefeller Family Portrait: From John D. to Nelson. Boston: Little, Brown, and Company, 1959.
Moscow, Alvin. The Rockefeller Inheritance. Garden City, NY: Doubleday & Co., 1977.
Nevins, Allan. John D. Rockefeller: The Heroic Age of American Enterprise. 2 vols. New York: Charles Scribner's Sons, 1940.
Nevins, Allan. Study In Power: John D. Rockefeller, Industrialist and Philanthropist. 2 vols. New York: Charles Scribner's Sons, 1953.
Okrent, Daniel. Great Fortune: The Epic of Rockefeller Center. New York: Viking Press, 2003.
Ratto, Pietro. Rockefeller e Warburg. Le famiglie più potenti della terra. Bologna: Arianna Editrice [it], 2019. .
Reich, Cary. The Life of Nelson A. Rockefeller: Worlds to Conquer 1908-1958. New York: Doubleday, 1996.
Roberts, Ann Rockefeller. The Rockefeller Family Home: Kykuit. New York: Abbeville Publishing Group, 1998.
Rockefeller, David. Memoirs. New York: Random House, 2002.
Rockefeller, Henry Oscar, ed. Rockefeller Genealogy. 4 vols. 1910 - ca.1950.
Rockefeller, John D. Random Reminiscences of Men and Events. New York: Doubleday, 1908; London: W. Heinemann. 1909; Sleepy Hollow Press and Rockefeller Archive Center, (Reprint) 1984.
Roussel, Christine. The Art of Rockefeller Center. New York: W.W. Norton and Company, 2006.
Scheiffarth, Engelbert. Der New Yorker Gouverneur Nelson A. Rockefeller und die Rockenfeller im Neuwieder Raum Genealogisches Jahrbuch, Vol 9, 1969, p16-41.
Sealander, Judith. Private Wealth and Public Life: Foundation Philanthropy and the Reshaping of American Social Policy, from the Progressive Era to the New Deal. Baltimore: Johns Hopkins University Press, 1997.
Siegmund-Schultze, Reinhard. Rockefeller and the Internationalization of Mathematics Between the Two World Wars: Documents and Studies for the Social History of Mathematics in the 20th Century. Boston: Birkhauser Verlag, 2001.
Stasz, Clarice. The Rockefeller Women: Dynasty of Piety, Privacy, and Service. New York: St. Martin's Press, 1995.
Tarbell, Ida M. The History of the Standard Oil Company. New York: Phillips & Company, 1904.
Winks, Robin W. Laurance S. Rockefeller: Catalyst for Conservation, Washington, D.C.: Island Press, 1997.
Yergin, Daniel. The Prize: The Epic Quest for Oil, Money, and Power. New York: Simon & Schuster, 1991.
Young, Edgar B. Lincoln Center: The Building of an Institution''. New York: New York University Press, 1980.

See also 
 Gilded Age

External links 

Rockefeller Financial
The Rockefeller Group
The Rockefeller Foundation
The Rockefellers – An American Experience Documentary
 

 
American families of German ancestry
American families of Scotch-Irish ancestry
Business families of the United States
German-American history
Political families of the United States
Rockefeller Foundation
People from Neuwied
Christian families